The First Faculty of Medicine of Charles University is one of five medical faculties of Charles University, Prague, Czech Republic. Founded in 1348 at the same time as the university itself, it is the oldest medical faculty in Central Europe and the 11th oldest medical institution in the world. Situated in the centre of Prague, the faculty provides education in all fields of general medicine. It is regularly ranked in the top 1% of medical faculties globally (See ranking below).

It is one of the five medical faculties of Charles University, alongside the Second and Third Faculties, both in Prague, and faculties in Plzen and Hradec Kralove.

It has two student associations. One for the Czech parallel (SMC) and one for the English parallel (LF1 MEDSOC). The student associations have their offices in Faust House and are responsible for helping new students get used to the university life as well as organise all the parties and activities, including Freshers Week every September. The faculty has recently established a surgical society, which envisions the nurture of aspiring surgeons from all years by providing research opportunities, away clerkships and workshops.

History 
Charles University was established in 1348 and a medieval faculty of medicine was one of the four founding faculties (with the Faculty of Arts, Faculty of Law, and Faculty of Theology). In 1882, as part of the division of the university during the Austro-Hungarian Empire, a separate German faculty was founded. The two parallel faculties, one German and one Czech, remained until the foundation of the independent state of Czechoslovakia in 1918, when the German faculty was disbanded. In 1953 the former Faculty of Medicine in Prague was divided into three medical faculties: the Faculty of General Medicine, the Faculty of Pediatric Medicine, and the Faculty of Hygiene. Following the Velvet Revolution, these three faculties evolved into the First, Second and Third Faculty of Medicine, respectively.

Admissions

Admission to the faculty is based on performance in high school (Biology, Chemistry and Physics), English proficiency and performance in entrance exams. Entrance examinations are conducted at the university and by some representative offices abroad, and are considered to be among the hardest university entrance exams in Europe. After the entrance exams, interviews are conducted with successful candidates.

Most of the international students studying medicine at the institute originate from the United States, Canada, United Kingdom, Norway, Sweden, Germany, Israel, Malaysia, India and the Middle East, and more.

Academics 
Around 3400 students are enrolled in the First Faculty of Medicine. Most teaching facilities are located in the centre of Prague, near Charles Square, I. P. Pavlova and Albertov. The majority of clinical instruction takes place at the General University Hospital in Prague, and other teaching hospitals include the Military University Hospital in Prague, Thomayer Teaching Hospital, Bulovka Hospital and Motol University Hospital.

The faculty runs bachelor's and master's degree programmes, and several Ph.D. study programmes. The two main study programmes at the faculty are General Medicine and Dentistry, taught either in English or Czech. The Medicine program lasts for 6 years, and Dentistry for 5 years.

The teaching staff consists of around 110 professors, 150 associate professors and around 700 assistant professors. Alongside preclinical and clinical teaching, the faculty is also an active research institution.

Ranking and reputation 

The faculty is consistently ranked in the top 1% out of 17000 institutions in the world. It is currently ranked #1 in the Czech Republic and #133 in clinical medicine in the world.

Gallery

See also 
 List of medical schools in Europe
 Medical school#Czech Republic

References 

Charles University
Medical schools in the Czech Republic